Bucchino is a surname. Notable people with the surname include: 

Gino Bucchino (born 1948), Italian politician
John Bucchino (born 1952), American songwriter, accompanist, cabaret performer, and teacher